Alan Bradley is a fictional character from the British ITV soap opera, Coronation Street, played by Mark Eden. He first appeared on 15 January 1986 and became the show's main antagonist until the character was killed off on 8 December 1989.

The character's story arc began with Alan visiting Weatherfield to reconcile with his long-lost daughter Jenny (Sally Ann Matthews), following the death of her mother and his ex-wife Pat – who was reported to have been killed in a car accident. This works successfully and Alan subsequently moves into Weatherfield to live with Jenny and her foster mother Rita Fairclough (Barbara Knox), whom he gradually establishes a relationship with as the pair end up falling in love with each other. Alan later plans to marry Rita in a surprise wedding between them, but is left unhappy when she doesn't go through with it and prefers for them to remain partners.

Throughout his time on the show, Alan exhibits a volatile and temperamental streak due to his psychopathic nature. This proves evident at the times where the character inflicts his behaviour onto Rita's several friends and neighbors alike. During the course of his story arc, Alan has an affair with local barmaid Gloria Todd (Sue Jenkins); beats up her troublesome customer, Terry Duckworth (Nigel Pivaro), at The Rovers Return Inn public house for badmouthing him; repeatedly clashes with the pub's landlady Bet Lynch (Julie Goodyear); sparks a feud with Jenny's boyfriend Martin Platt (Sean Wilson); threatens to hurt Rita's business partner Mavis Riley (Thelma Barlow) and her husband Derek Wilton (Peter Baldwin) for intruding on his plan to make changes at Rita's shop called "The Kabin"; planned to buy the Weatherfield garage from its departing manager, Brian Tilsley (Christopher Quinten), until the latter decided to stay in the street with his wife Gail (Helen Worth) and cancelled the sale before Alan could bid for the new ownership; harbored unrequited romantic feelings for his client Carole Burns (Irene Skillington); dismissed Jenny's engagement to her fiancé Patrice Podevin (Franck Dubosc) after she ran away to France to stop her father controlling every aspect of her life; tried unsuccessfully to go into partnership with his boss Dave Craig (Alan Hulse) upon creating his own business, initially dubbed "Bradley Securities Limited" and later renamed "Weatherfield Security Systems"; and attempted to rape his receptionist Dawn Prescott (Louise Harrison) after she rebuffed his efforts to spark a romance between them.

The follow-up of his attempt to rape Dawn proved to be Alan's downfall, after Rita finds out about just not the incident and his other misdeeds – but also learns that Alan had fraudulently posed as her late husband, Len (Peter Adamson), and mortgaged her house without her own consent to start his own business. When she reports his crime to the building society to stop him from further exploiting her assets, Alan tries to kill Rita and is consequently arrested as a result. He is soon released and Alan proceeds to torment Rita for months, which leads to her having a breakdown and fleeing to Blackpool. Because of this, Alan becomes shunned in Weatherfield and practically loses everything – including his daughter – all around him. He eventually tracks down Rita after uncovering her whereabouts from The Rovers' landlord, Alec Gilroy (Roy Barraclough), and travels to Blackpool in a bid to prove to the community that he didn't kill her. The character's attempt to force Rita in returning to Weatherfield with him leads to Alan chasing her onto an oncoming Blackpool tram, which narrowly misses Rita and ends up fatally hitting Alan – consequently killing him off and thus ending his reign of terror for good.

Depicted as one of the best soap villains of all time and in the programme itself, the character Alan Bradley served as an inspiration for future antagonists on the show; including Richard Hillman (Brian Capron) and Pat Phelan (Connor McIntyre).

Storylines

Backstory
Alan Bradley was born on 20 July 1939. At somepoint he married a woman named Pat, and in 1971 she conceived a daughter – which they named Jenny (Sally Ann Matthews). During that time, Alan became his own master; he liked the free life of a bachelor and spent little time at home. In part this was because his job installing air conditioning systems took him all over the country. In 1978, Alan and Pat split up and he left home – not to see Jenny again for eight years. He and Pat were subsequently divorced. By the end of 1985, Alan was living in digs in Scarcroft – near Leeds.

1986–1989
In January 1986, Alan was tracked down by social services when Pat was killed in a road accident. He learned that Jenny, now fourteen, was living in Weatherfield with her foster mother, the local shopkeeper Rita Fairclough (Barbara Knox). The news prompted Alan to go to Weatherfield from Leeds and collect his daughter, but Jenny resented him for abandoning her. With Rita's help, Alan convinced Jenny to give him a chance. He got a transfer to Weatherfield and rented a flat near the street so that Jenny could live with him without changing school.

Alan had been seeing a lot of Rita and he was attracted to her, up to the point where he regularly visits her at the latter's own shop – The Kabin. While she also developed feelings for him, Rita was shocked to learn that Alan exhibits a masculine and aggressive streak – as it often reminds him of her late husband Len (Peter Adamson). By the time their relationship had become passionate, Alan had doubts about his relationship with Rita and began two-timing on her with her friend Gloria Todd (Sue Jenkins) – who worked as a barmaid at the local public house, The Rovers Return Inn – after finding her a flat in his building. Gloria was youthful and glamorous; a woman he could more easily take charge of than he could Rita. This escalated when Alan learned that the street's troublemaker, Terry Duckworth (Nigel Pivaro), was pestering Gloria. He later confronted Terry and warned him to stay away from Gloria, but soon learned that Terry was causing trouble for Jenny as well. When Alan confronted him again in The Rovers to warn him off Jenny and then Terry called him a "demolition man", Alan lashed out at Terry and brutally attacked him before being kicked out by the pub's landlady – Bet Lynch (Julie Goodyear). Later on, Alan apologized to Gloria for losing his temper and explained that he previously had a two-year suspended sentence for assault – further claiming that its relation to his past is still hanging down on him.

By then, Alan began to date both Gloria and Rita without either's knowledge – and eventually sleeps with Gloria. The women eventually realised that he was two-timing them. When Rita told Alan that she was aware of his two-timing behaviour, he admitted to sleeping with Gloria and was forced by Rita to choose which of the two he wishes to be with. He ended up choosing Rita after Gloria had already ended her relationship with Alan after confronting him about his affair. Alan and Rita managed to slowly rebuild their romance and put their rocky start behind them.

By September 1986, Alan was made redundant and his pride kept him from telling Rita; however, she discovered this from fellow resident Mavis Riley. A new job soon came up for Alan in Liverpool, and Rita convinced him to take it even though it meant three months in Dubai; Alan agreed to take the job and later arranges for Jenny to move in with Rita.

In January 1987, a year after he had first arrived in Weatherfield, Alan returned to the news that Jenny had been in a car crash in Rita's car. When he visited his daughter, Alan learned that she has been dating her schoolmate Martin Platt (Sean Wilson) and suspected that he had caused the crash knowing that Martin often sped in his car. Alan later confronted Martin and was ready to hit him, but Jenny admitted that she'd been the one who was driving. Martin and Jenny later confessed to the police, with a little persuasion from Alan, but Rita refused to press charges so nothing came of it. Alan thanked Rita and told her he would compensate her from the money he was earning in Dubai. He then continued to woo Rita and sought to take the next step by proposing to her. Despite expecting Rita to say yes, Alan was astonished when she said no, with Rita stating that she preferred for them to just carry on as partners.

Following his return from Dubai, Alan moved in to Rita's house and began to spend more quality time with Jenny, which partly helped took his mind from the disappointment of Rita declining his proposal. Alan soon took an interest in The Kabin, opening a video library and installing an electric till within the shop to modernise it. His changes worried Mavis Riley (Thelma Barlow), as she suspected that Alan was worming his way into The Kabin – just as he had done with Rita's affections – and might plan to have her replaced. Mavis confided to her husband Derek Wilton (Peter Baldwin) about her suspicions and he questioned Alan about this on Mavis' behalf. In response, Alan threatened Mavis and Derek to stay away from him; Rita soon learned what Alan was doing and told him to not make any more changes at her shop.

Soon enough, Alan felt emasculated by being second to Rita financially and decided to buy Tilsley's Garage when Brian Tilsley (Christopher Quinten) made plans to move down south with his wife Gail (Helen Worth), but at the last minute, the couple pulled out of the sale. Alan, unhappy that his chances of buying the garage were ruined, still had his heart set on marrying Rita and, thinking she needed more convincing, booked a surprise wedding for them at the Weatherfield Register Office. He planned to lure Rita there under the pretext that they had been invited to a friend's wedding. When they got there, Rita couldn't believe Alan had actually planned for her own surprise wedding. Rita promptly got back into the taxi that she had come in. Alan left feeling humiliated, slowly came to realise that Rita would never marry him.

By the time Jenny turned sixteen, she decided to leave school despite Alan wanting her to stay and complete her A-Levels. Alan and Rita later found out that Jenny had gone to France to escape them from telling her what to do. Alan furiously went to France to find her, but he came back empty-handed. She returned to the Weatherfield in October 1987 with the news that she was marrying a French student, Patrice Podevin (Franck Dubosc), after they were now engaged. Alan thought Jenny was too young and immature to get married and refused to give his blessing. While Rita opposed Alan's views and gave Jenny her own blessing, Alan proved to be right when Jenny cheated on Patrice with Gary Grimshaw (Colin Kerrigan); Patrice broke off the engagement to Jenny and Alan later comforted her when her ex-fiancée went back to France on his own.

While he managed to reconcile with Jenny in light of her broken engagement, Alan became bored with merely running the video library and sought to expand his business interests. In 1988, he found a job fitting burglar alarms. Alan soon wanted to go into partnership with his manager Dave Craig (Alan Hulse) and asked Rita to loan him £6,000 to buy into the business. When Dave wasn't interested, Alan decided to set up on his own business, creating Bradley Securities Limited using Rita's money to buy a company car. Despite her reservations, Rita gave Alan a loan and helped him set-up his potential business setting him up in Len's old Builder's Yard.

In the summer, Alan started to ignore Rita and became romantically interested with one of his clients Carole Burns (Irene Skillington). This continued to the point that Alan left Rita, telling her that he was tired of the way she "coldly" puts him down. In response, Rita demanded that he return the money that she had loaned to him; he reluctantly complied and Alan was later forced to vacate the yard. Alan moved out of Rita's house but his business collapsed as both the bank and Carole both refused to give him a loan. In November 1988, he left Carole and again returned to Rita and Jenny. They were initially sceptical towards Alan until he explained that he didn't come back because of the money, but had plans to set up a shop without needing a penny from her. Without Rita's knowledge, he stole the deeds to her house and re-mortgaged it for £15,000 by posing as Len whose name was still on the deeds to Rita's house. With cheque in hand, Alan told Rita the bank had given him a loan; Rita believed him and Alan later transferred his business to a shop unit in Curzon Street, renaming it Weatherfield Security Systems to cover his tracks with the building society.

Alan did everything to keep the truth from Rita, whilst also trying to retain his "family-man" relationships with both her and Jenny in the process. He had all letters from the bank re-directed to the shop and handled all mail and phone calls himself. The business grew more successful when Alan employed Martin to be his assistant, partly at Jenny's urging, and later hired the newly arrived Dawn Prescott (Louise Harrison) to become his receptionist. Alan quickly fancied Dawn and asked her out, telling her Rita was just his landlady, but she wasn't interested.

This only encouraged him and he soon confided to Dawn his feelings to her in March 1989. When she rejected his romantic appeals, Alan attempted to rape her, but she managed to escape by rushing out onto the street. The incident proved to be Alan's downfall as Dawn not only told Rita about the incident, but she also exposed his fraudulent scheme by telling Rita about the letters and phone calls that were asked for Leonard Fairclough. This prompted Rita to investigate Alan's activities, and she was gobsmacked to learn what he had done. On the night Jenny celebrated her eighteenth birthday, Rita confronted Alan for his deceit and he admitted to committing fraud, before arguing how his actions had led to the success of the business he started. Alan was totally unfazed with the way how Rita reacted towards discovering his lies, but his mood changed when he learns that she had just stopped this from going any further; Rita had earlier visited the building society and, after finding out the conditions of Alan's bank loan, exposed his deceit by confirming Len's fate. Alan grew enraged when Rita ended their relationship by telling him that he is finished and that his time was up. In response, he lashed out at Rita as she answered a phone call from Jenny. Jenny had wanted to check to see if her father and foster mother were alright. After forcefully stopping Rita from answering the call, Alan hit and then tried to suffocate her with a cushion. Rita was saved by Jenny and Martin, returning from a party, came in the house. Alan promptly fled from the house and drove out of Weatherfield, leaving Jenny and Martin to look after Rita before she was taken to hospital.

The next day, Alan found himself wanted by the police after Rita had told them about what he did and Jenny learned about her father's activities. He phoned Jenny and asked her to meet him at a train station, with his passport and money. Jenny reluctantly met up with her father at his request, but the police followed Jenny without her knowledge and Alan was arrested when Martin and the police caught up with him. As he was taken into custody, Alan believed that Jenny shopped him to the police and disowned her. He then learned nobody had reported him to the Police, and Jenny's Police guard was stood-down. Alan was charged with deception and actual bodily harm and spent six months on remand. When Jenny later visited her father in prison, he asked her to beg Rita to play down what had happened; however, Jenny refused when she realised that her father was only thinking about himself and ignored his wishes.

In October 1989, Alan's trial started. He pleaded guilty to deception and actual bodily harm in a bid to avoid going to prison. This worked successfully as Alan was given two years in prison, but walked free as he had already served enough time in prison on remand without bail. Rita was horrified by the verdict and became convinced Alan was going to take revenge on her. Her fears quickly proved to be correct when Alan resorted to torment Rita out of spite for the way she destroyed his business and ended their relationship. He first visited Rita while she was alone at her house, claiming that he was there to see Jenny. Tensions grew when she asked him to leave. He refused and continued to intimidate Rita, leaving her desperately afraid.

Alan later moved into a bedsit near the street and landed himself a job at the building site near Rita's house, wanting to stay close to her. When Jenny confronted her father about what he was doing, he told his daughter that he was staying in Weatherfield claiming to still love her – as well as caring for Rita. Jenny reluctantly accepted this and Alan's false claims ended up sparking trouble between his daughter and Rita, up to the point where Jenny wrongly claimed that Rita was being vindictive and turns against her.

When Rita learned that her shop had been vandalised, she quickly suspected Alan of being the culprit and the police took him in for questioning. Alan proved to be innocent when the police caught a gang of children trying to sell videos that were stolen from The Kabin. A few weeks later, Rita disappeared without a trace and Alan was again questioned by the police. He was once more cleared when any evidence of his alleged involvement proved insufficient. He was nevertheless suspected by his fellow neighbors of killing Rita and burning her at the building site. Alan later went to The Rovers and ended up getting drunk, which prompted Rita's longtime friend and neighbour Percy Sugden (Bill Waddington) to confront him about her fate. When Percy continued to pester Alan over what he supposedly did to Rita, he threatens to attack Percy – which prompted his friends Don Brennan (Geoffrey Hinsliff) and Alf Roberts (Bryan Mosley), along with Terry's father Jack (Bill Tarmey), to all stand up to Alan. At the point where Alan was being hounded by everyone in The Rovers, he grabs a bottle and prepares to attack them until Jenny's best-friend Sally Webster (Sally Dynevor) rushes into The Rovers – telling them that the police have found something at the building site. This causes everyone to rush outside, assuming that it is Rita's body that has been found. Alan reluctantly joins them after Alf's wife and Gail's mother, Audrey Roberts (Sue Nicholls), sarcastically asks if he is bothered enough to feel curious in knowing what the police will find at the site.

It soon transpired that Rita had actually gone over to Blackpool to recover from a breakdown, which occurred in light of Alan's treatment of her. Despite this and the fact that was found at the building site, Alan lost his job because of the trouble it had caused with the police.

Alan became overly bitter and swore revenge on Rita, blaming her for ruining his life. He soon learns of Rita's whereabouts after overhearing The Rovers' landlord, Alec Gilroy (Roy Barraclough), confiding to Bet that Rita is in Blackpool. Alan later follows Bet to Blackpool, with the intent on finding Rita and taking her back to Weatherfield to prove to everyone that he didn't kill her. He forced his way into the hotel where Rita was staying in, only to instead find Bet there before threatening her and demanding to know where Rita was. With Bet was unwilling to tell him, Alan deduces that Rita would be coming back to the hotel after finding her clothes in the wardrobe. He then returns to his car to await for her. As Rita walks back towards the hotel, Alan spots her and orders her to get in his car. When she refuses, Alan forces her into the passenger seat, only for her to jump out just as he returns to the driver's side. Alan promptly chases Rita across the road, where they end up running into the direction of an oncoming Blackpool tram – which narrowly misses Rita but ends up hitting Alan, killing him. The tram promptly stops at the impact of accident, as Bet rushes outside to comfort Rita.

Legacy
Later on, Alan is confirmed to have officially died and news of his death becomes public knowledge in Weatherfield – with Jenny becoming devastated to learn about her father's death. She later attends his funeral with Martin and Sally, along with the latter's husband Kevin (Michael Le Vell), supporting her in attendance. The impact of Alan's torment on Rita and his subsequent death continues to negatively affect her relationship with Jenny. However, they eventually reconcile when Jenny comes to accept that her father had truly never loved her and this signals the end of Alan's reign of terror once and for all.

Reception
The character Alan Bradley is well received by critics. The episode that aired on 13 March 1989, where Alan tried to kill Rita by suffocating her, attracted over 25 million viewers when combining the original broadcast with the omnibus, while the following episode on 15 March 1989 with Rita in hospital and Alan hiding from the police, attracted 26.93 million viewers, which is the highest combined rating in the shows history. The episode that aired on 20 March 1989, attracted an audience of 19.01 million for its original Monday night broadcast and was the shows highest-rated single broadcast of the year.

The first episode of series 2 of Phoenix Nights contains a visual reference to the death of Alan Bradley, where flowers with a sign 'In Memory of Alan, 8 Dec 89', RIP' are tied to a lamp-post beside the tram line.

Both Eden and co-star Barbara Knox have stated that they regret the death of Alan, wishing that he had returned in some fashion at a later time. Alan Bradley has been consistently voted as one of Coronation Streets greatest villains in several polls since.

On 8 December 2009, Mark Eden unveiled a blue plaque to mark the 20-year anniversary of the screening of the famous Coronation Street episode. The plaque is located outside The Strand Hotel, North Promenade, Blackpool which was the venue chosen for the filming of much of the footage.

In further episodes of Coronation Street references to Alan occur, most recently in the episode aired April 2015 when Jenny called into Rita's shop The Kabin, in which Norris Cole asked her if she was travelling to the shops by tram; intended as a cutting quip referencing the way Alan died. In June 2016, Alan's daughter Jenny would save her ex-boyfriend Kevin Webster's (Michael Le Vell) little son Jack (Kyran Bowes) from a tram – once again referring to Alan's iconic demise.

See also
List of Coronation Street characters (1986)
List of soap opera villains
Television in the United Kingdom
Fictional portrayals of psychopaths

References

External links
Biography at corrie.net
List of Episodes and link to view synopsis

Coronation Street characters
Television characters introduced in 1986
Fictional con artists
Male villains
Fictional stalkers
Fictional domestic abusers
Male characters in television
Fictional criminals in soap operas